Luz is a 2018 German supernatural horror film written, produced, edited and directed by Tilman Singer in his directorial debut. It stars Luana Velis as the titular character, a taxi driver who is questioned by the police following a mysterious accident.

Plot
After getting into a car crash, taxi driver Luz is brought to the police station for questioning. A doctor attempts to hypnotize her and get information about the night. However, the doctor is possessed by an ancient demon that Luz summoned during her stay at a religious school back in her youth.

Cast
Luana Velis – Luz Carrara
Jan Bluthardt – Dr. Rossini
Julia Riedler – Nora Vanderkurt
Nadja Stübiger – Bertillon
Johannes Benecke – Olarte
Lilli Lorenz – Margarita

Production and release
The film is Singer's film school thesis project and an homage to 1980s European horror films. After debuting at the 2018 Berlin Film Festival, Yellow Veil Pictures was formed to buy the release ahead of the 2018 Fantasia Film Festival.

Critical reception
  The site's critical consensus reads, "Luz takes a refreshingly unique approach to horror possession tropes, elevated by a chilly mood and minimalist scares." Katie Rife of The A.V. Club gave the film a B rating, praising its attention to sound and how it advanced the horror genre's retro sensibilities, summing up the work as "unapologetically weird and utterly fearless". Variety praised the film's experimental technique, commenting that the film's chronology can be debatable and its plot incoherent but this style compels, "our imaginations to see things other than what’s immediately before us".

See also
2019 in film

References

External links
 
 
 Page from the Berlin Film Festival

2018 horror films
German horror films
2010s German-language films
2010s Spanish-language films
Body horror films
LGBT-related horror films
2018 LGBT-related films
2010s English-language films
2010s German films